Su Hui may refer to:

 Su Hui (poet), 4th-century Chinese poet
 Su Hui (politician), Vice-Chairwoman of the Chinese People's Political Consultative Conference
 Su Hui (rower), Chinese rower